Désiré Félicien François Joseph Mercier (21 November 1851 – 23 January 1926) was a Belgian cardinal of the Roman Catholic Church and a noted scholar. A Thomist scholar, he had several of his works translated into other European languages. He was known for his book, Les origines de la psychologie contemporaine (1897). His scholarship gained him recognition from the Pope and he was appointed as Archbishop of Mechelen, serving from 1906 until his death, and was elevated to the cardinalate in 1907.

Mercier is noted for his staunch resistance to the German occupation of 1914–1918 during the Great War.
 After the invasion, he distributed a strong pastoral letter, Patriotism and Endurance, to be read in all his churches, urging the people to keep up their spirits. He served as a model of resistance.

Biography

Early life and ordination
Désiré Mercier was born at the château du Castegier in Braine-l'Alleud, as the fifth of seven children of small business owners Paul-Léon Mercier and his wife Anne-Marie Barbe Croquet. Three of Mercier's sisters became religious sisters. His brother Léon became a physician.

One of Mercier's maternal uncles was the Reverend Fr. Adrien Croquet. In the 1860s Fr. Croquet became a missionary to the Grand Ronde Indian Reservation in western Oregon near the Pacific coast, where his surname was anglicized to Crockett. In the 1870s, a Mercier cousin, Joseph Mercier, joined their uncle Fr. Croquet in Oregon. He married a woman of one of the Native American tribes resident there. Today, several thousand descendants of Joseph and his wife are members of the tribe.

Mercier studied at the College Saint‑Rombaut of Malines (1863-1868), and entered the minor seminary at Mechelen in 1868 to prepare for the church. He attended Mechelen's grand seminary from 1870 to 1873.

Mercier received the clerical tonsure in 1871, and was ordained to the priesthood by Archbishop Giacomo Cattani, the nuncio to Belgium, on 4 April 1874. Mercier continued with graduate studies, obtaining his licentiate in theology (1877) and doctorate in philosophy from the University of Louvain.

Thomist scholarship
He returned to Malines in 1877 and taught philosophy at the minor seminary and soon after was named spiritual director of the seminarians.  His comprehensive knowledge of Saint Thomas Aquinas earned him the newly erected chair of Thomism at Louvain's Catholic university in 1882. It was in this post, which he retained until 1905, that he forged a lifelong friendship with Dom Columba Marmion, an Irish Thomist. Raised to the rank of monsignor on 6 May 1887, Mercier founded the Higher Institute of Philosophy at the Louvain University in 1899, which was to be a beacon of neo-Thomist philosophy.

He founded in 1894 and edited until 1906 the Revue Néoscholastique, and wrote in a scholastic manner on metaphysics, philosophy, and psychology. Several of his works were translated into English, German, Italian, Polish, and Spanish. His most important book was Les origines de la psychologie contemporaine (1897).

Bishop and cardinal

His reputation within his field gained the recognition of Pope Pius X, and Mercier was appointed as Archbishop of Mechelen and Primate of Belgium on 7 February 1906. He received his episcopal consecration on the following 25 March from Archbishop Antonio Vico, and took as his episcopal motto: Apostolus Jesu Christi. Mercier was created cardinal priest by Pope Pius X in the consistory of 15 April 1907. Three days later Pope Pius gave him his cardinal's ring and assigned him the titular church of S. Pietro in Vincoli.

During the modernist controversy, Mercier was both progressive and antimodernist. He sought to assess the compatibility of Thomistic philosophy with rapidly developing scientific knowledge. He was a brilliant scholar, open to contemporary ideas and sufficiently respected that he was able to protect scholars at Louvain, such as Bollandist Hippolyte Delehaye, from accusations of "modernism". Through his influence, Mercier prevented Albin van Hoonacker's Les douze petits prophètes traduits et commentés ["The twelve minor prophets translated and annotated"] from being placed on the Index.

Mercier was a close friend of Benedictine Lambert Beauduin and kept apprised of liturgical and ecumenical developments. From 1921 to 1926 he held regular conversations with Anglican theologians, notably Charles Wood, 2nd Viscount Halifax, foreshadowing the Church's future dialogue with the Anglicans. Anglicanism, Mercier believed, must be "united, not absorbed".

Pope Benedict XV sent his portrait and a letter of whole-hearted support to Mercier in 1916, and at one point told him, "You saved the Church!" Mercier was one of the cardinal electors in the 1922 papal conclave, which selected Pope Pius XI.

World War I German occupation

In 1914 the German army attempted a surprise invasion of France by invading neutral Belgium. Mercier had to leave his see on 20 August of that same year to attend the funeral of the late Pius X, and participate in the following conclave to elect a new pope.

Returning from the conclave Mercier passed through the Port of Le Havre, where he visited wounded Belgian, French and British troops. Once back in his archdiocese, he found the Mechelen Cathedral to have been partially destroyed. In the Imperial German atrocities that ensued in the Rape of Belgium, thirteen of the priests in Mercier's diocese were killed, not to mention many civilians, by Christmas 1914.

With his pastoral letter, Patriotism and Endurance, of Christmas 1914, Mercier came to personify Belgian resistance to the German occupation.  The pastoral letter had to be distributed by hand as the Germans had cut off the postal service. Mercier's passionate, unflinching words were taken to heart by the suffering Belgians. He sometimes became a focus of Allied propaganda during the war. He was kept under house arrest by the Germans, and many priests who had read the letter aloud in public were arrested as well.

In Ireland, Cardinal Mercier's detention and indeed the German occupation was used to help recruitment for the British army among Irish Catholics. Following the war, Mercier helped with the re-establishment of the Irish Franciscan College (St Anthony's College, Leuven), with his friend since their seminary days in Louvain, Mons. James J. Ryan. Mercier Press in Ireland is named in his honor.

Final years and death
Following World War I, Mercier undertook an excursion to raise funds to rebuild and stock a new library of the University of Leuven. The original library had been burned by the Germans in the war. In his travels to raise funds, Mercier visited New York City for his first and only time. Among other projects, Mercier also unsuccessfully attempted to have the League of Nations mandate of Palestine awarded to Belgium.

Mercier suffered from persistent dyspepsia. In early January 1926 he underwent surgery for a lesion of the stomach.  During surgery, the anesthetized cardinal held a conversation with his surgeon.

In his final days, Mercier was visited by King Albert and Queen Elisabeth, Lord Halifax, and family members. He entered a deep coma around 2:00 p.m. on 23 January and died an hour later, at age 74. The cardinal was buried at St. Rumbolds Cathedral.

The cardinal harbored great devotion to the Sacred Heart.

Honors 
 Papal honorary prelate, by papal decree of 8 November 1889.	
 : Grand Cross in the Order of Leopold
 Grand Cross in the Order of Malta
 Grand Cross in the Order of Saints Maurice and Lazarus
 : Grand Cross in the Order of the Oak Crown
 Grand Cross in the Order of the Holy Sepulchre
 Grand Cross in the Order of the Double Dragon
 : Grand Cross in the Order of the White Eagle
 : Imperial Order of the Rising Sun
 : Legion of Honour
 : Order of Christ
 Order of Saint Anna
 Order of Carol I
 : Order of the Sun of Peru
 : Order of Isabella the Catholic
: Pro Ecclesia et Pontifice
 Red Cross Medal of the United States
 Imperial Order of the Double Dragon, Qing Dynasty China

Views

Inter-Belgian relations
Mercier is known for favoring French speakers and opposing the use of Dutch. Though in general social minded, he was blind to the social aspects of the Flemish Movement and opposed many of its aims. Two examples. (1) Claiming that Dutch could never be a full-fledged cultural language, he fought all attempts to have Flemish high school and university students educated in their native Dutch. He relented only when overwhelmed by the political pressure the Flemish Movement was generating. He managed to have Pope Benedict XV address him a letter in which he admonished priests that they should not address arguments extraneous to their supernatural commitment nor publish on secular subjects without their superior's permission. Mercier promptly published this letter.

Church and science
Mercier recognized the mathematical talent of Georges Lemaître as a young seminarian, and urged him to study Einstein's theories of relativity. Lemaître became an early expert in general relativity as it applied to cosmological questions. He went on to propose an expanding model of the universe, based on both Einstein's and de Sitter's models. Abbé Georges Lemaître developed his "primeval atom" hypothesis, together with researchers of the University of Louvain, and Gamow, Alpher and Herman into the better known Big Bang theory of the origin of the universe.

References

Sources

Further reading
Johan Ickx. 2018. La guerre et le Vatican: Les secrets de la diplomatie du Saint-Siège (1914-1915), Paris: Les éditions du Cerf.
Sophie De Schaepdrijver. 1999. De groote oorlog: het koninkrijk België tijdens de Eerste Wereldoorlog. 7th ed. Amsterdam: Olympus.
Jan De Volder. 2018. Cardinal Mercier in the First World War. Belgium, Germany and the Catholic Church. Leuven: Leuven University Press.

External links

Désiré-Joseph Mercier at 1914-1918-online
The Cardinals of the Holy Roman Church
Catholic-Hierarchy

1851 births
1926 deaths
People from Braine-l'Alleud
Belgian cardinals
20th-century Belgian Roman Catholic theologians
Roman Catholic archbishops of Mechelen-Brussels
20th-century Roman Catholic archbishops in Belgium
Belgian people of World War I
Knights Grand Cross of the Order of Saints Maurice and Lazarus
Members of the Order of the Holy Sepulchre
Grand Cordons of the Order of the Rising Sun
Recipients of the Order of the Sun of Peru
Recipients of the Order of Isabella the Catholic
Cardinals created by Pope Pius X
Grand Crosses of the Order of Christ (Portugal)
19th-century Belgian Roman Catholic theologians